Prestine (Prèhten in camunian dialect) is a former comune in the province of Brescia, in Lombardy. It is now a frazione of the municipality of Bienno. It is situated in the Val Camonica. Neighbouring communes are Bagolino, Bienno, Breno and Niardo.

References

Cities and towns in Lombardy